Robin Lee (née Robin Lee Irwin, born November 7, 1963) is an American country music artist. She recorded in the 1980s and 1990s as Robin Lee for Evergreen and Atlantic Records, charting at number 12 on Hot Country Songs in 1990 with "Black Velvet". After charting her last single in 1994, she began working as a songwriter for other artists.

Biography
Lee's musical interests began in high school, when she would perform at school dances and talent competitions. She later recorded demos for publishing companies, and by 1982, she made her debut on the U.S. Billboard Hot Country Singles & Tracks charts with "Turning Back the Covers (Don't Turn Back the Time)". She charted several more singles throughout the 1980s, with her cover of Alannah Myles' "Black Velvet" peaking at No. 12 in 1990. Lee has since signed as a songwriter to Chrysalis Music, and has written album cuts for LeAnn Rimes and Jo Dee Messina, as well as single for Lila McCann ("With You"), Tracy Lawrence ("Lonely"),  The Clark Family Experience ("Standin' Still"), Katrina Elam ("No End in Sight"), Roxie Dean “Everyday Girl”, Crystal Shawanda ("My Roots Are Showing"), and Reba McEntire “While You Were Sleeping”.

She was formerly married to songwriter Trey Bruce, son of singer-songwriter Ed Bruce.

Discography

Albums

Singles

Music videos

References

American women country singers
American country singer-songwriters
Singers from Nashville, Tennessee
1963 births
Living people
Atlantic Records artists
Country musicians from Tennessee
Singer-songwriters from Tennessee
21st-century American women singers
21st-century American singers